is a Japanese rugby union player who plays as a flanker.
Ben grew up in Gunnedah, NSW. His junior clubs were the Narrabri Blue Boars and the Gunnedah Red Devils. 
   He currently plays for Panasonic Wild Knights in Top League.

International

After 3 Top League seasons for Panasonic Wild Knights, Ben Gunter received his first call-up to his adopted country, Japan head coach Jamie Joseph has named Dylan Riley in a 52-man training squad ahead of British and Irish Lions test.

On Saturday October 23, 2021, Ben made his international debut for Japan against Australia at the Showa Denko Dome in Oita, starting at flanker.

References

Australian rugby union players
1997 births
Living people
Rugby union flankers
Saitama Wild Knights players
Australian expatriate sportspeople in Japan
Sunwolves players
Japanese rugby union players
Japan international rugby union players